Tinissa apicimaculata is a moth of the family Tineidae. It is found in Guangxi, China.

The wingspan is about 12 mm for females. The forewings have a creamy white ground color on the basal 1/3 and a yellowish brown ground color on the distal 2/3, becoming gradually darker toward the apex. The hindwings are grayish brown, but yellowish brown near the apex.

Etymology
The specific name is derived from the Latin prefix apici- (meaning apex) and maculatus (meaning macula) and refers to the ovate, blackish brown spot near apex of forewing.

References

Moths described in 2012
Scardiinae